Hermann Busse (23 November 1903 – 27 January 1970) was a German politician of the Free Democratic Party (FDP) and former member of the German Bundestag.

Life 
Busse had been a council member of the city of Herford since 1952. From 1961 to 1969 he was a member of the German Bundestag. He had entered parliament via the state list of the FDP North Rhine-Westphalia.

Literature

References

1903 births
1970 deaths
Members of the Bundestag for North Rhine-Westphalia
Members of the Bundestag 1965–1969
Members of the Bundestag 1961–1965
Members of the Bundestag for the Free Democratic Party (Germany)